Bona of Savoy, Duchess of Milan (10 August 1449 – 23 November 1503) was Duchess of Milan as the second spouse of Galeazzo Maria Sforza, Duke of Milan. She served as regent of Milan during the minority of her son 1476–1481.

Life
Born in the old castle of Avigiana, Turin, Bona was a daughter of Louis, Duke of Savoy and Anne de Lusignan of Cyprus. She was one of nineteen children. Her many siblings included: Amadeus IX of Savoy, Philip II, Duke of Savoy, Louis of Savoy, Count of Geneva, Marguerite of Savoy and Charlotte of Savoy, who married King Louis XI.

In 1464, Bona was to have been betrothed to Edward IV of England, until his secret marriage to Elizabeth Woodville was revealed. She showed her resentment in later years by refusing to contemplate a marriage between either of her daughters and one of Edward's sons. She married Galeazzo Maria Sforza on 9 May 1468. An alliance between the Sforza and the royal house of France had been rumoured from as early as 1460, and "in June 1464 Bona of Savoy was officially offered to Galeazzo by letters from the  King of France and the Duke of Savoy".

Bona's husband was assassinated, on 26 December 1476 at the age of 32 by three young noblemen on the porch of the cathedral church of San Stefano in Milan. Galeazzo was succeeded after his 10-year reign by his 7-year-old son Gian Galeazzo Sforza (1469–1494). Bona relied on the enlightened competence of the ducal secretary Cicco Simonetta and was proclaimed regent on 9 January 1477 in the name of her son. Her position, which was strengthened by the able Simonetta, was however contested by her brothers-in-law, eager to control the will of the young duke.

These (among whom the ambitious Sforza Maria stood out) tried in May 1477 to oust Bona and Simonetta from the tutelage of Gian Galeazzo Maria, but Simonetta managed to precede and exile them (25 May). The revenge of the brothers-in-law, however, was not long in coming: helped by the leader Roberto Sanseverino, the young Sforza set up an army that invaded the Duchy, conquering Genoa and Tortona between 1478 and 1479. To facilitate their exploits was also the progressive fall from grace of Simonetta before the eyes of Bona. The latter, meanwhile, had embarked on a romantic relationship with one of her waiters from Ferrara, Antonio Tassino. It is not clear when the man became her lover, but after the death of Galeazzo Maria quickly acquired great power and enormous influence over Bona, thus becoming a personal enemy of Cicco.

After the death of Sforza Maria, perhaps poisoned by Bona herself and Simonetta, Antonio Tassino persuaded his lover to grant his other brother-in-law, Ludovico, the return to Milan, in the hope that this would be enough to free him from the uncomfortable presence of Cicco.

Bona accepted his request and on 8 September, reconciled with his brother-in-law, effectively condemning the faithful Cicco Simonetta to the death penalty.The sentence pronounced by Cicco Simonetta could only be true: although she still officially remained the regent, assisted by the new ducal chancellor Bartolomeo Calco, Ludovico il Moro had the political situation of the State in his hands. On 7 October 1480, in fact, Ludovico, under the pretext of protecting the life of his nephew from the aims of Antonio Tassino, had him transported to the "Rocchetta", the most impregnable area of the Castello Sforzesco, then forced his sister-in-law to fix the sentence to exile for Antonio Tassino and his family, who had to return to their homeland in Ferrara.

Due to the forced separation from her lover, Bona began to show signs of hysteria. She demanded to leave the duchy and return to Piedmont or France, where she had grown up, and threatened suicide when Ludovico and Roberto Sanseverino tried to prevent her, so that the two were forced to give in. So Bona signed the formal renunciation of the regency of his son and left for France, but at the insistence of the little son he was then content to stop and live in the castle of Abbiategrasso, with a retinue consisting mainly of moro spies.

The little Gian Galeazzo signed a document with which he proclaimed his uncle tutor in place of his absent mother, as it was arranged in the will of the deceased Galeazzo Maria in the event that Bona had not wanted or could not take responsibility for the regency. Ludwig thus concentrated almost all political power in his own hands.

Bona of Savoy commissioned the Sforza Book of Hours, which was painted in about 1490 by a famous court artist, Giovan Pietro Birago. She used the book, which contained devotional texts and is considered to be one of the most outstanding treasures of the Italian Renaissance.

Issue
 Gian Galeazzo Sforza (20 June 1469 – 21 October 1494), married his first cousin Isabella of Naples (2 October 1470 – 11 February 1524), by whom he had issue, including Bona Sforza, Queen consort of King Sigismund I of Poland, who in her turn had six children.
 Hermes Maria Sforza (10 May 1470 – 18 September 1503), Marquis of Tortona.
 Bianca Maria Sforza (5 April 1472 – 31 December 1510), in January 1474, married firstly Philibert I, Duke of Savoy; on 16 March 1494, married secondly, Holy Roman Emperor Maximilian I, she had no issue by her two husbands.
 Anna Maria Sforza (21 July 1476 – 30 November 1497), married Alfonso I d'Este, later Duke of Ferrara. She died in childbirth.

Ancestry

References

1449 births
1503 deaths
People from Chambéry
French royalty
Princesses of Savoy
Duchesses of Milan
15th-century women rulers